On Upper Maslovka Street is a 2004 Russian drama film directed by Konstantin Khudyakov.

Plot 
The film tells the story of an elderly woman Anna Borisovna, who in the past was a successful sculptor, and the director of the amateur theater Peter, who had a good start to his career, but then he lost ground. He does not have his own housing and Anna Borisovna took it to her, and he, in turn, looks after her. They are very different, but despite this they live together for many years.

Cast 
 Alisa Freindlikh as Anna Borisovna
 Yevgeny Mironov as Petya
 Alyona Babenko as Nina (as Alyona Babenko)
 Evgeniy Knyazev as Matvey
 Ekaterina Guseva as Katya
 Dmitriy Kulichkov as Semyon Kraychuk
 Ilya Rutberg as Music Teacher
 Anna Gulyarenko as Petya's Mother
 Inga Strelkova-Oboldina as Roza (as Inga Oboldina)
 Mariya Dyakova

References

External links 
 

2004 films
2000s Russian-language films
Russian drama films
French drama films
2004 drama films
2000s French films